The End of Fear is an EP by Dum Dums vocalist Josh Doyle.

Track listing
"The End of Fear" - 4:02
"Aphrodite" - 4:13
"Boyracer" - 5:04
"Solarstorm" - 4:15
"Become Beautiful" - 7:55
 Contains the hidden track "Boyracer Ringtone".

Credits
 Written by Josh Doyle
 Produced by Sam Shacklock
 All guitars and vocals by Josh Doyle
 All beats, bass and synths by Sam Shacklock
 Photography by Josh Doyle & Jenny Doyle
 Mastered by Richard Dodd

References

Josh Doyle albums
2004 EPs